Ashton Bennett (born 8 September 1988) is a Jamaican professional footballer who currently plays as a forward for York Region Shooters in the Canadian Soccer League.

Career

Toronto FC
On 22 January 2013 Bennett was selected as the 20th overall pick in the 2013 MLS Supplemental Draft by Toronto FC. Then on 1 March 2013 it was announced that Bennett had officially signed with Toronto FC before the start of the 2013 MLS season. Bennett then made his professional debut for the team on 1 May 2013 against the Montreal Impact in the Canadian Championship in which he came on in the 74th minute for Jonathan Osorio as Toronto lost the match 6–0. On 14 May 2013, Bennett was waived by Toronto FC.

Portmore United
After being released by Toronto FC, Bennett signed for Portmore United F.C. of the National Premier League in his native Jamaica and scored his first goal for the club on 15 December 2013 in which his 35th-minute strike against Sporting Central Academy helped Portmore United to a 2–1 victory. In 2015, he returned to Canada to play in the Canadian Soccer League with the York Region Shooters.

Career statistics

References

External links 
 

1988 births
Living people
Jamaican footballers
Jamaican expatriate footballers
Coastal Carolina Chanticleers men's soccer players
Toronto FC players
Portmore United F.C. players
Association football forwards
People from Clarendon Parish, Jamaica
Toronto FC draft picks
Expatriate soccer players in the United States
Expatriate soccer players in Canada
York Region Shooters players
Canadian Soccer League (1998–present) players
All-American men's college soccer players